William C. Marcil (born 1936) is a North Dakota businessman in the state's newspaper industry. Marcil was born in Rolette, North Dakota. He graduated from the University of North Dakota, where he was a member of Lambda Chi Alpha fraternity, in 1958. He then married Jane Black, daughter of Norman Black, Jr.; owner-publisher of the Fargo Forum newspaper. Jane Black and William Marcil have two children (Deb and Bill Jr). In 1969, Marcil became the president and publisher of the Forum. 

Today, Marcil is chairman of Forum Communications, a multi-media company based in Fargo. The company has grown to own numerous media outlets (including print, radio, television, and internet) throughout the state and region.  He bought all outstanding shares in the company in 1984.

In 2006, Marcil was presented with the Roughrider Award.

On September 14, 2010, Marcil announced that he would step down as the publisher of the Forum on December 1, 2010.  Marcil turned over control of the Forum to his son, Bill, Jr., but remained chairman of parent company Forum Communications.

References

External links
Information about Marcil from the Roughrider Award website
Forum Communications website

1936 births
Living people
People from Rolette County, North Dakota
Forum Communications Company
University of North Dakota alumni
American media executives